is an urban park in the city of Hachinohe, Japan, located in the central part of the city. It is located on the former grounds of Hachinohe Castle. The park has an observation deck, a playground, and about 50 cherry trees.

References

Parks and gardens in Hachinohe
Urban public parks in Japan